The threshold of pain or pain threshold is the point along a curve of increasing perception of a stimulus at which pain begins to be felt. It is an entirely subjective phenomenon. A distinction must be maintained between the stimulus (an external thing that can be directly measured, such as with a thermometer) and the person's or animal's resulting pain perception (an internal, subjective thing that can sometimes be measured indirectly, such as with a visual analog scale). Although an IASP document defines "pain threshold" as "the minimum intensity of a stimulus that is perceived as painful", it then goes on to say (contradictorily in letter although not in spirit) that:

Traditionally the threshold has often been defined, as we defined it formerly, as the least stimulus intensity at which a subject perceives pain. Properly defined, the threshold is really the experience of the patient, whereas the intensity measured is an external event. It has been common usage for most pain research workers to define the threshold in terms of the stimulus, and that should be avoided ... The stimulus is not pain (q.v.) and cannot be a measure of pain. 

Although the phrasing may not convey it perfectly, the distinction clearly meant is the aforementioned one between the stimulus and the perception of it. The intensity at which a stimulus (e.g., heat, pressure) begins to evoke pain is thus called by a separate term, threshold intensity. So, if a hotplate on a person's skin begins to hurt at 42 °C (107 °F), that is the pain threshold temperature for that bit of skin at that time. It is not the pain threshold (which is internal/subjective) but the temperature at which the pain threshold was crossed (which is external/objective).

The intensity at which a stimulus begins to evoke pain varies from individual to individual and for a given individual over time.

Heat
The temperature at which heat becomes painful for a recipient is called the heat pain threshold for that person at that time.
One study showed that morning-oriented people have higher pain threshold for heat as compared to evening-oriented individuals.

Hearing
The pressure at which sound becomes painful for a listener is the pain threshold pressure for that person at that time. The threshold pressure for sound varies with frequency and can be age-dependent. People who have been exposed to more noise/music usually have a higher threshold pressure. Threshold shift can also cause threshold pressure to vary. Prolonged exposure to sound at levels evoking pain can cause physical damage, potentially leading to hearing impairment.

The volume in acoustics refers to loudness. It is a common term for the amplitude of sound or the sound pressure level. Different values for pain threshold pressure level and pain threshold pressure are found in the literature:

See also
Absolute threshold of hearing
Dolorimeter – an instrument used to measure pain threshold
Exposure action value
Limen – threshold of perception 
Phon
Sone
Weber–Fechner law, regarding the difference between stimulus and sensation 
Weighting curve and A-weighting regarding dB(A)

References

Hearing
Pain